Topcliffe railway station served the village of Topcliffe, North Yorkshire, England from 1848 to 1959 on the Leeds and Thirsk Railway.

History 
The station opened on 1 June 1848 by the Leeds and Thirsk Railway. The station was situated on both sides of the A167. The station's name was changed to Topcliffe Gate in July 1854 but it was reverted to Topcliffe in April 1863. The goods yard was located on the up side behind the station platform and consisted of three sidings, two of them serving coal drops. There was also a cattle dock. In 1911, the main freight handled at the station were 237 tons of potatoes and 253 tons of barley.  The station closed to both passengers and goods traffic on 14 September 1959.

References

External links 

Disused railway stations in North Yorkshire
Railway stations in Great Britain opened in 1848
Railway stations in Great Britain closed in 1959
1848 establishments in England
1959 disestablishments in England